Padali is a census village in the Satara district, in the Indian state of Maharashtra. It is surrounded by a Mountains on its three sides. There is a big temple of Heljaidevi Mandir at Village. Agriculture is the main occupation in the village  with more than 75% of the total area being used for agricultural activities.

As per constitution of India and Panchyati Raaj Act, Padali village is administrated by Sarpanch (Head of Village) who is elected representative of village.

History 
As per constitution of India and Panchyati Raaj Act, Padali village is administrated by Sarpanch (Head of Village) who is elected representative of village.

List of Sarpanch
 Surekha Jadhav 2017-2022
 Manjusha Bhoj 2012-2017
 Bhanudash Jadhav 2007-2012
 Uma Augade 2002-2007
 Shivaji Bhoj  1997-2002

Geography 
Padali is a village in Karad Taluka in Satara District of Maharashtra, India. It belongs to Desh or Paschim Maharashtra region and to Pune Division. It is located 32 km towards South from district headquarters Satara, 28  km from Karad, 276 km from state capital Mumbai. Pin code is 415106 and post office is Padali (Satara). Gaikwadwadi(1.5 km), Gosavewadi(1.5 km), Banugadewadi(1.3 km), Wather( 5.3 km ), Sathewadi( 2.5 km ), are the nearby villages to Padali. Padali is surrounded by Karad Taluka towards North Kadegaon Taluka, Kadegaon Taluka towards South, Koregaon Taluka towards east, Patan Taluka towards west.

Satara, Wai, Mahabaleswar, Karad  are the nearby cities.

Locality 
Railway station
 Satara Rail Way Station  - 35 km
 Targaon Rail Way Station  - 10 km
Engineering Colleges Near Padali
 Satara Polytechnic Khindwadi Satara
 K.B.P. Polytechnic, Panmalevadi varied Satara
 Gourishankar Polytechnic, Limb Khind Satara
 Government Eng. College, Vidhyanagar Karad
 Satara College of Pharmacy Degaon, Satara
Schools & Colleges near Padali
 Z.P. Primary School Padali
 Sardar Babasaheb Mane Vidyalaya Padali

References 

Villages in Satara district